Lists of horse-related topics are lists related to horses. They include lists of breeds, related species, individual horses (historical and fictional), race horses, horse race results and horse shows

Types

Breeds 
List of horse breeds
List of horse breeds in DAD-IS
List of African horse breeds
List of gaited horse breeds
List of Brazilian horses
List of U.S. state horses
List of French horse breeds
List of Italian horse breeds

Scientific classification 
List of perissodactyls for all modern relatives of the horse
Odd-toed ungulate for the mammal order containing the horse

Individual horses 
List of historical horses
List of horses of the American Civil War

Fictional and legendary horses 
List of fictional horses
List of winged horses
Horses of the Æsir
 Horse in Chinese mythology

Race horses 
List of leading Thoroughbred racehorses
Repeat winners of horse races

Sires lists 
Leading sire in North America
Leading sire in Australia
Leading sire in France
Leading sire in Germany
Leading sire in Great Britain and Ireland
Leading sire in Japan
Leading broodmare sire in Japan
Leading broodmare sire in Great Britain and Ireland
Leading broodmare sire in North America

Lists of horse race results

A–F
All Brandy Stakes top three finishers
Belmont Stakes Top three finishers
Black-Eyed Susan Stakes top three finishers
Breeders' Cup Juvenile Turf top three finishers
Chick Lang Stakes top three finishers
Dahlia Stakes top three finishers
Dancing Count Stakes top three finishers
Deputed Testamony Stakes top three finishers
Dixie Stakes top three finishers
Federico Tesio Stakes top three finishers
Forward Gal Stakes top three finishers

G–L
Gardenia Stakes top three finishers
Geisha Handicap top three finishers
Hollywood Futurity top three finishers
Horatius Stakes top three finishers
Humana Distaff Handicap finishers and starters
James W. Murphy Stakes top three finishers
Kentucky Derby top four finishers
Kentucky Oaks top three finishers
Laurel Futurity Stakes top three finishers

M–Z
Marshua Stakes top three finishers
Maryland Million Classic top three finishers
Maryland Million Ladies top three finishers
Maryland Million Nursery top three finishers
Miracle Wood Stakes top three finishers
Native Dancer Stakes top three finishers
Preakness Stakes top four finishers
Private Terms Stakes top three finishers
Selima Stakes top three finishers
Travers Stakes top three finishers
Turf Classic Stakes finishers and starters

Other lists 
List of horse shows
List of World Grand Champion Tennessee Walking Horses
List of BLM Herd Management Areas
List of rodeos

References 

Horses
Horses